Charles D. Gaither (November 27, 1860 – March 29, 1947) was a United States Army officer and police commissioner. He was active in the Maryland Army National Guard in the late 19th and early 20th centuries and in the Baltimore Police Department in the 1920s and 1930s. He served in the Spanish–American War and World War I.

Biography
Gaither was born on November 27, 1860, in Howard County, Maryland, on a farm two miles south of Ellicott City. His father was an officer who served the Confederate States of America during the American Civil War and the U.S. afterward. When he was a young man, Maryland saw some riots serious enough that the Fifth and Sixth Infantry regiments were called in to help. Gaither observed their actions, and it influenced his decision making when he later served on the Baltimore police department.

Gaither served in the Maryland Army National Guard, initially retiring in 1890 and called back into service in 1896. He participated in the Spanish–American War, going to Cuba and holding a command in the Ninth (colored) U.S. Volunteer Infantry. Catching typhoid fever, they were mustered out and returned home. Gaither assumed command of the Fifth Maryland Veterans Corps after he became a colonel, and upon his promotion to brigadier general in 1912, he assumed command of the First Maryland Brigade. That same year, Gaither was in charge of an American rifle team that won an international tournament in Buenos Aires. He served on the Mexican border in 1917, and he also commanded Fort McClellan for a short time. After commanding the 58th Infantry Brigade, Gaither retired after he discovered he had a heart murmur.

Maryland Governor Albert Ritchie appointed Gaither as the commissioner of the Baltimore Police Department, and he served in the position from 1920 to 1937, the longest tenure of anyone holding the position. Observers commented positively on his leadership in this position.

Gaither died on March 29, 1947, after several weeks in the hospital.

Personal life
Gaither was married three times, with his first marriage ending in divorce and with his second wife dying. He had two daughters.

References

Bibliography

1860 births
1947 deaths
People from Howard County, Maryland
People from Baltimore
Commissioners of the Baltimore Police Department
American military personnel of the Spanish–American War
United States Army generals
National Guard (United States) generals